Stefano Massini is an Italian writer, essayist and playwright. He was born in Florence in 1975, and studied Literature at the University of Florence. He began his theatrical career at the Piccolo Teatro di Milano, and at the Maggio Musicale Fiorentino. He is best known for The Lehman Trilogy, which has played in both London and Broadway to great critical acclaim, and won the Tony Award for Best Play. The play was also the basis for his novel Qualcosa sui Lehman, which won multiple awards. Some observers find the play's depiction of the Lehmans to be overtly anti-Semitic. His second novel was titled L'interpretatore dei sogni.

His work has been staged in France, Germany, Austria, Belgium, Switzerland, Spain, Greece, Canada, Argentina, Algeria, Peru, Mexico, South Korea, and Russia. He has won many prizes, among them the Vittorio Tondelli prize and the Ubu award.

Works in translation 
 Qualcosa sui Lehman (2016) - The Lehman Trilogy, trans. Richard Dixon (2019) 
 Dizionario inesistente (2018) - The Book of Nonexistent Words, trans. Richard Dixon (2021)

References

Italian male dramatists and playwrights
University of Florence alumni
1975 births
Living people
Prix Médicis essai winners
Tony Award winners